Axel S. Vogt (January 19, 1849 – November 11, 1921) was the Pennsylvania Railroad's Chief Mechanical Engineer between March 1, 1887, and February 1, 1919.  He was succeeded by William Frederic Kiesel, Jr.  After retiring from the PRR, Vogt continued to consult for the Baldwin Locomotive Works until his death.

Among his accomplishments was the creation of the world's first static locomotive test facility at the Pennsylvania Railroad's Altoona Works, enabling locomotives to be exhaustively and repeatably tested under load – essentially, a locomotive version of the chassis dynamometer.  Under his supervision, the PRR designed and produced many noteworthy steam locomotive designs, such as the E6 Atlantics, K4s Pacifics and L1s Mikados.  He was also instrumental in the Pennsylvania's electrification development, although it did not reach full fruition until after his death.

He held many patents in the field of railway engineering.

References 

 Pennsylvania Railroad Technical and Historical Society (2004). PRR Chronology: 1919, June 2004 edition.  Retrieved on December 26, 2005.
 
 

Locomotive builders and designers
1849 births
1921 deaths
Pennsylvania Railroad